Princess Mathilde of Bavaria (Mathilde Marie Theresia Henriette Christine Luitpolda; 17 August 1877 – 6 August 1906) was the sixth child of Ludwig III of Bavaria and his wife, Maria Theresa of Austria-Este. After her early death, Life-Dreams: The Poems of a Blighted Life, a collection of poems she wrote, was published in 1910.

Family and early life
Princess Mathilde was born on 17 August 1877 as the sixth child and third daughter of Ludwig III of Bavaria at the family's summer residence of Villa Amsee in Lindau. Though she was the favorite daughter of her father, she and her mother were not close. Some speculate that she only married as an escape from her home.

Later years

Marriage and issue

Various candidates were rumored to be engaged to Princess Mathilde at different times. These included, in 1896, the Prince of Naples, but he married Princess Elena of Montenegro later that year. Others included Archduke Franz Ferdinand of Austria, heir to the Austro-Hungarian throne, and Jaime, Duke of Madrid.

On 1 May 1900 in Munich, Mathilde married Prince Ludwig of Saxe-Coburg and Gotha, a son of Prince Ludwig August of Saxe-Coburg and Gotha and his wife Princess Leopoldina of Brazil. He was a captain in the Austrian army, and had been raised in Brazil as a grandson of Emperor Pedro II. The prince was also from the Catholic branch of the House of Saxe-Coburg and Gotha. They had two children: Prince Antonius of Saxe-Coburg and Gotha (17 June 1901 – 1 September 1970); and Princess Maria Immaculata of Saxe-Coburg and Gotha (10 September 1904 – 18 March 1940).

Death
Mathilde died of tuberculosis at the age of 28, on 6 August 1906, in Davos, Switzerland. Her remains are buried in the Church of Saints Peter and Paul in the little village of Rieden near her family home at Schloss Leutstetten. Her husband remarried a year later to Countess Anna of Trauttmansdorff-Weinsberg.

In 1910 Mathilde's family anonymously published some of her poems as Traum und Leben: Gedichte einer früh Vollendeten.  In 1913 John Heard translated and published them in English as Life-Dreams: The Poems of a Blighted Life.

Ancestry

References

1877 births
1906 deaths
Bavarian princesses
Burials at the Church of Saints Peter and Paul (Rieden, Swabia)
German women poets
Princesses of Saxe-Coburg and Gotha
House of Saxe-Coburg-Gotha-Koháry
Tuberculosis deaths in Switzerland
19th-century poets
19th-century German writers
20th-century deaths from tuberculosis
19th-century women writers
Daughters of kings